Criminal gang may refer to:
 Prison gang
 Street gang
 Gangs within organized crime
 Outlaw motorcycle club

See also
 Gang (disambiguation)